Taibat Olaitan Lawanson is a professor of urban management and governance at the University of Lagos, Nigeria, where she leads the Pro-Poor Development Research Cluster. She is also co-director at the University of Lagos Centre for Housing and Sustainable Development. Her research focuses on the interface of social complexities, urban poverty and the quest for spatial justice in urban planning in Africa.

Career 
Lawanson holds a PhD in Urban and Regional Planning from the Federal University of Technology, Akure, Nigeria. She was head of Department or Urban and Regional Planning at the University of Lagos between 2013 and 2015,  She was a 2017 DAAD visiting professor to the Habitat Unit, Technical University of Berlin.

Lawanson has published singly or jointly with other scholars on issues relating to urban informality, environmental justice and pro-poor development in peer-reviewed academic journals and publications including Urban Studies, Area Development and Policy, International Journal of Environmental Research and Public Health, Cities & Health, among others. 

Lawanson is a member of the board of directors of the Lagos Studies Association and a member of the International Advisory committee of the UN-HABITAT flagship State of the World’s Cities Report. She is a pioneer World Social Science Fellow of the International Social Science Council, a Fellow of the Nigerian Institute of Town Planners, and an alumna of the Rockefeller Foundation Bellagio Centre.

References 

Urban planning in Nigeria
Academic staff of the University of Lagos
Year of birth missing (living people)
Living people
Nigerian academics
Federal University of Technology Akure alumni